Rheinsberg (Mark) station is a railway station in the town of Rheinsberg (Mark), located in the Ostprignitz-Ruppin district in Brandenburg, Germany.

References

Railway stations in Brandenburg
Buildings and structures in Ostprignitz-Ruppin
Railway stations in Germany opened in 1899
1899 establishments in Prussia